Oyèrónkẹ́ Oyěwùmí (born November 10, 1957) is a Nigerian gender scholar and full professor of sociology at Stony Brook University. She acquired her bachelor's degree in political science at the University of Ibadan in Ibadan, Nigeria and went on to pursue her graduate degree in Sociology at the University of California, Berkeley. Oyěwùmí is the winner of the African Studies Association's 2021 Distinguished Africanist Award, which recognizes and honours individuals who have contributed a lifetime of outstanding scholarship in African studies combined with service to the Africanist community.

In her 1997 monograph, The Invention of Women: Making an African Sense of Western Gender Discourses, she offers a postcolonial feminist critique of Western dominance in African studies. The book won the American Sociological Association's 1998 Distinguished Book Award in the Gender and Sex category.

Motive 
Oyěwùmí began her educational journey at the University of Ibadan (UI), where she studied political science. During her time at UI, she took a sociology course that left a "deep impression," which influenced her to study sociology in graduate school. Then, in graduate school at the University of California at Berkeley, she enrolled in her first sociology of gender seminar. 

Through taking such a course, she states,"I was shocked by the grand and grandiose claims being made about women of all societies and from all times: claimed that women are powerless... because Western societies looked a certain way, then all other societies had to be like that." Oyěwùmí was intrigued by these claims because, in her own culture, Yoruba do not use gender. Instead, in Yoruba, they express in terms of seniority. Furthermore, Oyěwùmí realized that various theories and concepts came from European and American experiences that may not have any relation to African societies. Understanding the implications of Western theories and concepts on non-western countries is an area of interest for Oyěwùmí.

The Invention of Women 
In The Invention of Women, Oyěwùmí presents modern Yoruba gender stratification as a Western colonial construct. She states that the woman question and binary gender are ideas that stem from the West, effectively eliminating their validity in analyzing gender relations within African society; she specifically speaks to the nonsexist and gender-neutral nature of the Yoruba language. Through this deconstruction, she introduces an alternate method of understanding both Western and Yoruba cultures in the modern world.

Oyěwùmí begins by naming biological determinism as central to the Western understanding of gender. This idea that biological differences serve as an organizing principle for societies is a Western philosophy that doesn't transfer to Yoruba societies, which do not use the body as the basis for any social roles. Oyěwùmí explains how colonial institutions went onto impose this biological understanding of gender onto the Yoruba. Additionally, she tackles the incongruities in feminist theory that assert gender as a social construct and the subjugation of women as universal. She says that Western feminism's beliefs on gender are not applicable nor relevant across all cultures, citing her own culture of the Yoruba. She explains that gender was never socially constructed in Yoruba society, and relative age was instead the main organizing principle.

'If anything, my work is the ultimate evidence about the fact that gender is indeed socially constructed. It didn't come from heaven, it didn't come from nature, there are these categories that are created, historically and culturally. What my work actually does is to affirm the idea that gender is socially constructed'.

This links to her larger argument that culture can not be an explanation for anything, because white supremacy and imperialism have created dominant and subordinate cultures in society that have turned Eurocentric opinion into fact. She calls this "cultures of impunity". Oyěwùmí further critiques Western feminism for generating a homogeneous and ethnocentric structure that is parallel to modern capitalist society. She describes how black women have been both silenced and objectified within feminism, which leads to unequal representation and feminist consensuses that reflect only the dominant white voices. Oyěwùmí remarks on the irony of this, because feminist theory seeks to ultimately destabilize such oppressive patriarchal systems globally. This contradiction leads Oyěwùmí to believe black women need a new space in scholarly spaces where they can be adequately represented. Thus, she calls for a new field of "African Gender Studies", that is separate from elitist white feminism, and that can properly understand and acknowledge African culture's perspectives on gender and womanhood.

Critiques 
According to Nigerian writer Bibi Bakare-Yusuf, while Oyěwùmí's work rightfully challenges gender stratification as a Western import, her conclusion is based on the faulty reasoning of language determinism. Oyěwùmí heavily relies on the lack of gendered expressions and the overwhelming presence of age expressions in Yoruba language to prove that these categorizations are respectively familiar and unfamiliar to this society. However, Bakare-Yusuf argues that the threat of mistranslation works both ways. Just as there are fewer systems of gendering among the Yoruba, there could be fewer systems of ageing in Western cultures. Oyěwùmí's work should serve as a naming of culturally specific systems, but not as a testimony that these systems cannot be exchanged and translated. Additionally, academics for African studies such as Carole Boyce Davies have critiqued Oyěwùmí's perspective on gender in Africa as static, and that her argument about the lack of gender of Yoruba lacks sufficient historical research for Yoruba's societal stratification pre-colonialism.

Books

Fellowships and awards 
 2003/2004 Rockefeller Humanities Fellowship on Human Security 
 1998 Distinguished Book Award in the Gender and Sex Section of the American Sociological Association
 1998 Finalist for the Herskovits Prize of the African Studies Association.
 2021 Distinguished Africanist Award of the African Studies Association

References

External links 
 Oyèrónkẹ́ Oyěwùmí on the website of Stony Brook University.

Living people
American people of Yoruba descent
Nigerian feminists
Nigerian emigrants to the United States
Stony Brook University faculty
University of California, Berkeley alumni
University of Ibadan alumni
Yoruba women academics
American women academics
Nigerian women academics
American sociologists
American women sociologists
Nigerian sociologists
Gender studies academics
Year of birth missing (living people)
 Yoruba people